The 1944 Ukrainian Cup was a football knockout competition conducting by the Football Federation of the Ukrainian SSR and was known as the Ukrainian Cup.

Competition schedule

First elimination round 
The main date for games was on 10 September 1944.

Second elimination round 
The main date for games was on 17 September 1944.

Third elimination round

Fourth elimination round 
The main date for games was on 1 October 1944.

Final group 
All games were played in Kyiv in October 8 through 15, 1944.

Top goalscorers

See also 
 Soviet Cup
 Ukrainian Cup

Notes

References

External links 
 Information source 

1944
Cup
1944 domestic association football cups